The middle-class squeeze refers to negative trends in the standard of living and other conditions of the middle class of the population. Increases in wages fail to keep up with inflation for middle-income earners, leading to a relative decline in real wages, while at the same time, the phenomenon fails to have a similar effect on the top wage earners. People belonging to the middle class find that inflation in consumer goods and the housing market prevent them from maintaining a middle-class lifestyle, undermining aspirations of upward mobility.

Overview

Origin of the term
Former U.S. Speaker of the House Nancy Pelosi used the term in November 2006 to provide context to the domestic agenda of the U.S. Democratic Party. The Center for American Progress (CAP) issued a report of the same title in September 2014. As well as this, the term was further propelled into the public consciousness when it was used by former UK Labour Party leader Ed Miliband, who promised to come to the defense of the group in 2010.

Definitions
The term "squeeze" in this instance refers to rising costs of key products and services coupled with stagnant or declining real (inflation-adjusted) wages. The CAP defines the term "middle class" as referring to the middle three quintiles in the income distribution, or households earning between the 20th to 80th percentiles. CAP reported in 2014: "The reality is that the middle class is being squeezed. As this report will show, for a married couple with two children, the costs of key elements of middle-class security—child care, higher education, health care, housing, and retirement—rose by more than $10,000 in the 12 years from 2000 to 2012, at a time when this family’s income was stagnant." Further, CAP argued that when the middle class is struggling financially, the economy struggles from a shortfall in overall demand, which reduces economic growth (GDP) relative to its potential. The goal of addressing the middle-class squeeze includes: "Having more workers in good jobs—who have access to good education; affordable child care, health care, and housing; and the ability to retire with dignity."

Charles Weston summarizes the middle-class squeeze in this way: "Being middle class used to mean having a reliable job with fair pay; access to health care; a safe and stable home; the opportunity to provide a good education for one’s children, including a college education; time off work for vacations and major life events; and the security of looking forward to a dignified retirement. But today this standard of living is increasingly precarious. The existing middle class is squeezed and many of those striving to attain the middle-class standard find it persistently out of reach." This squeeze is also characterized by the fact that, since the early 1980s, when European integration got into full swing, Belgium, France, Germany, Italy, and the United Kingdom have experienced strong real wage growth, while real wage growth in the United States has remained sluggish for the most part.

Causes

Causes include factors related to income as well as costs. The costs of important goods and services such as healthcare, college tuition, child care, and housing (utilities, rent, or mortgages) have increased considerably faster than the rate of inflation. This does not consider that all incomes were increasing, but only that higher incomes were increasing faster.  Income is not a zero-sum game.  Increasing demand for labor (lower income or skills) would increase incomes.

Income changes

Another narrative described by Paul Krugman is that a resurgence of movement conservatism since the 1970s, embodied by Reaganomics in the United States during the 1980s, resulted in a variety of policies that favored owners of capital and natural resources over laborers. Many developed countries did not have an increase in inequality similar to the United States over the 1980-2006 period, though they were subjected to the same market forces by globalization. This indicates U.S. policy was a major factor in widening inequality.

Either way, the shift is visible when comparing productivity and wages. From 1950 to 1970, improvement in real compensation per hour tracked improvement in productivity. This was part of the implied contract between workers and owners.

Historical perspective
In 1995, 60% of American workers were laboring for real wages below previous peaks, while at the median, “real wages for nonsupervisory workers were down 13% from peak 1973 levels.”

The other way in which income affects the middle class is through increases in income disparity. Findings on this issue show that the top 1% of wage earners continue to increase the share of income they bring home,  while the middle-class wage earner loses purchasing power as his or her wages fail to keep up with inflation and taxation. Between 2002 and 2006, the average inflation-adjusted income of the top 1% of earners increased by 42%, whereas the bottom 90% only saw an increase of 4.7%.

A 2001 article from “Time Magazine” highlighted the development of the middle-class squeeze. The middle class was defined in that article as those families with incomes between the Census Bureau brackets of $15,000 and $49,999. According to the census, the proportion of American families in that category, after adjustment for inflation, fell from 65.1% in 1970 to 58.2% in 1985. As noted in the article, the heyday of the American middle class, and its high expectations, came in the Fifties and Sixties, when the median U.S. family income (adjusted to 2001 price levels) went up from $14,832 in 1950 to $27,338 in 1970. The rising prosperity was, however, halted by the inflation of the Seventies, which carried prices aloft more rapidly than wages and thus caused real income levels to stagnate for more than a decade. The median in 2000 was only $27,735, barely an improvement from 1970.

Costs of key goods and services
While overall inflation has generally remained low since 2000, the costs of certain categories of "big ticket" expenses have grown faster than the overall inflation rate, such as healthcare, higher education, rent, and child care. These goods and services are considered essential to a middle-class lifestyle yet are increasingly unaffordable as household income stagnates.

Health care
The Center for American Progress reported in September 2014 that the real (inflation adjusted) cost of healthcare for middle-class families had risen by 21% between 2000 and 2012, versus an 8% decline in real median household income. Insurance and health care is an important factor regarding the middle-class squeeze because increases in these prices can put an added strain on middle income families. This situation is exactly what the House of Representatives survey shows regarding health care prices. In 2000, workers paid an average of $153 per month for health insurance coverage for their families, however, by 2005 these numbers had increased to $226 per month. The effects of the price change in health care can be seen in many ways regarding the middle class. The number of people who are uninsured has also increased since 2000, with 45.7 million Americans now without health insurance, compared to 38.7 million at the start of the millennium. Also, 18% of middle income Americans, making between 40,000 and 59,999 dollars were without health insurance during 2007 and more than 40% of the 2.4 million newly uninsured Americans were middle class in 2003. The rise in prices also causes a harm to working middle-class Americans because it makes it more costly for employers to cover their employees, as shown by the fact that in 2007 60% of companies offered their workers health insurance down from 69% in 2000. Also the number of Americans who reported skipping treatment due to its cost has increased from 17% to 24% during the same time period.

Education
The Center for American Progress reported in September 2014 that the real (inflation adjusted) cost of higher education for middle-class families had risen by 62% between 2000 and 2012. Two out of three college graduates begin their careers with student loan debt, amounting to $19,300 for the median borrower. These debts have a long-term effect on middle-class Americans, as 25% of Americans who have college debt claim it caused them to delay a medical or dental procedure and 14% report it caused them to delay their marriage.

Rent and property
The Center for American Progress reported in September 2014 that the real (inflation adjusted) cost of rent for middle-class families had risen by 7% between 2000 and 2012. Home-ownership is often seen as an arrival to the middle class, but recent trends are making it more difficult to continue to own a home or purchase a home.

Other factors

Job security changes
More than 92% of the 1.6 million Americans, who filed for bankruptcy in 2003, were middle class. Along with this, manufacturing jobs have decreased by 22% between 1998 and 2008 largely due to American businesses offshoring production (colloquially known as outsourcing).

Retirement security changes
The squeeze on the middle class is also causing difficulties when it comes to saving money for retirement because of decreased real incomes and increases in consumer prices. In 2007, 1 in 3 American workers said they hadn't saved at all for their retirement and of those who have started saving, more than half claim to have saved less than $25,000. There has also been a shift in employer retirement plans, with a shift from traditional defined benefit pension plans to 401k plans, in which there is no individual guarantee about the amount of retirement income that will be available.

Solutions
The CAP's 2014 report titled "The Middle Class Squeeze" suggested a variety of solutions:

 Increasing the number of jobs through policies that stimulate economic demand, raising the minimum wage, strengthening the labor movement (including unions), and using tax incentives to encourage more redistribution of corporate profits to workers.
Reducing the cost of healthcare, childcare, college tuition, and rent by either directly reducing the costs of these services or helping middle-class families pay for them, including education grants, debt forgiveness, more generous family leave, and free (subsidized) pre-school.

Polls and perceptions
According to a Survey on the Middle Class and Public Policy, just 38% of middle-class Americans say they live comfortably, and 77% believe that the country is headed in the wrong direction. Another 2008 report entitled "Inside the Middle Class: Bad Times Hit the Good Life" states that 78% of the middle class say it is more difficult now than it was five years ago. The middle class also responded that 72% believe they are economically less secure than ten years ago and almost twice the number of Americans claimed they were concerned about their personal economic stability. Showing that, overwhelmingly, the American people believe the middle class is being squeezed and are in a worse economic position than they were even 5 years ago.

Criticism 

In a 2012 Brookings Institution article, economist Richard Burkhauser blames a misleading and narrow focus on the 1 percent as well as a dishonestly narrow definition of “income” that ignores the value of non-monetary work benefits and government transfer payments for propagating the myth. He argues that if the value of government benefits and payments to low-income Americans is included, the problem of income inequality comes into question. Burkhauser calculates the impact of government transfers, the value of health insurance not paid for by households and the decline in household size to find that the bottom 20 percent had about 25 percent more income in 2007 than 1979 thus it could be seen that the bottom is in fact moving up.

When comparing household incomes over time, critics of the middle-class squeeze emphasis the need to look at identical households. The U.S. Census Bureau defines a household as one or more persons living in the same abode. Fifty years ago, only 15% of all U.S. households had a single occupant however by 2017 that percentage had nearly doubled, to 28% percent. Thus, the typical household today is much smaller which could be causing a perceived shrinkage.

See also 
Social Mobility
 Economic inequality
 Social status
 Cost of raising a child
 Cost of living
 Superwoman (sociology)
 Developing country
 Retail apocalypse

References

External links
Pew Center-The American Middle Class is Losing Ground-December 2015

Economic problems
Family economics
Income distribution
Middle class
Socio-economic mobility